"Pure Massacre" is a single released by Australian rock band Silverchair in 1995 and is the second single from their debut album Frogstomp, which was also released in 1995. It was a successful follow-up to the band's debut number-one single, "Tomorrow", peaking at number two in both Australia and New Zealand. It also reached number 17 on the US Billboard Alternative Songs chart and number 12 on the Billboard Mainstream Rock chart. The song was performed on Saturday Night Live.

Lyrics
According to interviews with lead singer and guitarist Daniel Johns, the song and its lyrics are inspired by the Bosnian War:

"It's pretty stupid, war, like that. So, it seemed the right thing to write a song about, rather than about the usual--girls or whatever. It took about a half an hour; it came straight to my head."

Music video
The Australian music video was directed by Robert Hambling and filmed at a real Silverchair concert in Sydney. The American music video was directed by Peter Christopherson.

Track listing
Australian CD (MATTCD005) /Cassette single (MATTC005)
 "Pure Massacre"
 "Faultline" (Live in Newcastle 21 October 1994)
 "Stoned" (Live in Newcastle 21 October 1994)

European CD single (Austrian/EU) (6612872)
 "Pure Massacre"
 "Acid Rain"
 "Blind"
 "Stoned"

UK CD single (6622642) 
 "Pure Massacre"
 "Acid Rain"
 "Blind"

UK 12" Vinyl (0166226420)
 "Pure Massacre"
 "Acid Rain"
 "Stoned"
 "Blind"

US promo CD  (ESK7275)
 "Pure Massacre (Radio Edit)"

Charts and certifications

Weekly charts

Year-end charts

Certifications

References

External links
 
 
 

1995 singles
Silverchair songs
Song recordings produced by Kevin Shirley
Songs written by Ben Gillies
Songs written by Daniel Johns